The 2004 Michigan Democratic presidential caucuses were held on February 7, 2004, as part of the 2004 United States Democratic presidential primaries. Frontrunner John Kerry won the caucuses in a landslide victory.

Results

References

2004 Michigan elections
Michigan
2004